The Man of Glass  is a 2007 Italian crime drama film directed  by Stefano Incerti.

It is based on real life events of the first Sicilian Mafia's "pentito", Leonardo Vitale.

Cast  
David Coco as Leonardo "Leuccio" Vitale
Tony Sperandeo as  The Uncle
Anna Bonaiuto as  The Mother
Ninni Bruschetta as Police Commissioner Bruno Contrada
Francesco Scianna as Salvatore

References

External links

Italian crime drama films
2007 crime drama films
2007 films
Films about the Sicilian Mafia
2000s Italian films